Craig Feroz (born 24 October 1977) is a Scottish former footballer who played as a forward for Brechin and Livingston.

Career

Brechin and Livingston
Feroz began his career at Brechin where he notched 11 goals in 66 appearances and began to catch the eye of other clubs. It was big spending Livingston who won his signature in 1998.  He was part of the Livi side that won the 1998–99 Scottish Second Division and knocked Scottish Premier League giants Aberdeen out of the 1998–99 Scottish Cup in the third round.

Loan spells
The forward found it difficult to get game time at Livi, and went out on loan in search of regular football.  He had spells at Stranraer and Ross County but struggled to find the minutes on the pitch that he was hoping for.

Stirling Albion and loan spells
In 2000, Feroz was brought to Stirling Albion by his former manager at Livi, Ray Stewart. He repaid his manager's faith in him immediately by scoring an equalising goal on his debut in a 2-2 draw against Clydebank on 5 August 2000.

Once again, Feroz went out on loan in search of regular playing time.  He had short spells at Queen of the South and Berwick Rangers.

Arbroath and the juniors
Feroz signed for Arbroath in 2002, making 23 appearances and scoring 3 goals during his time at Gayfield Park.

In 2003, Feroz moved into the junior leagues and had spells at Bathgate Thistle, Auchinleck Talbot, Glenafton, Kirkintilloch Rob Roy and Kilbirnie before retiring from playing in 2013.

Coaching career
Feroz was appointed manager of Montrose FC Women in 2020 and guided them to the Scottish Women's Football Championship North in the 2021-2022 season.

Honours

Player
Livingston
Scottish Football League Second Division : 1998-99

Manager
Montrose Women FC
Scottish Women's Football Championship North : 2021–22

References

External links
Craig Feroz on Soccerbase

1977 births
Living people
Scottish footballers
Scottish Football League players
Association football defenders
Livingston F.C. players
Brechin City F.C. players
Stranraer F.C. players
Ross County F.C. players
Stirling Albion F.C. players
Queen of the South F.C. players
Arbroath F.C. players
Bathgate Thistle F.C. players
Auchinleck Talbot F.C. players
Glenafton Athletic F.C. players
Kirkintilloch Rob Roy F.C. players
Kilbirnie Ladeside F.C. players
Footballers from Aberdeen